Slow start is an idiom referring to a lack of success at first.

Slow start may also refer to:
 Slow start is part of the TCP congestion control strategy
 Slow Start (manga), a Japanese manga series